Rangila Rasul or Rangeela Rasool (Urdu: رنگیلا رسول, Devanagari: रंगीला रसूल, English: Colourful Prophet) is a book published anonymously in Urdu in 1924.

The book was considered highly controversial due to its satire of the marital life of the Islamic prophet Muhammad. Its publication led to reforms in India's penal code that made blasphemy illegal and may have contributed to promote the partition of India.

Background
In the decade of 1920, the British Raj experienced episodes of violence between the Muslim and Hindu communities.

Between 1921 and 1922 there was the Malabar rebellion, also known as the Mopla or Mappila rebellion, as the Malabar Muslims are known.

The Muslims of Malabar not only rebelled against the British authorities, but also against the Hindu elites of the area who suffered from massacres and forced conversions at the hands of the Mappilas.

Between April and September 1927 there were at least 25 riots spread across Mumbai, Punjab, Bengal, Bihar, Odisha and other regions, leaving a balance of just over a hundred dead (103) and just over a thousand injured (1084).

In the Punjab region, these hostilities were accompanied by texts published by members of a religious community with the intention of criticising or offending other religious communities.

Rangila Rasul was published by members of the Hindu community in response to a pamphlet entitled "Sitaka Chinala" published by members of the Muslim community and that depicted the Hindu goddess Sita (wife of Rama, the hero of the Ramayana) as a prostitute.

Publication
Rangila Rasul was published in May 1924 and its copies sold out in a matter of a few weeks.

Originally published in Urdu and later translated into Hindi, it was written by a member of the Hindu reformist Arya Samaj sect by the name of Pandit Chamupati (or Champovati). The Arya Samaj sect was no stranger to religious controversy, as many of its leaders and ministers had made a name for themselves offending other religions, including other Hindu sects.

The publisher
Its publisher was Mahashe Rajpal (also known as Mahashay), a journalist who founded his publishing house 'Rajpal & Sons' in 1912. Rajpal published the book anonymously, without disclosing or making public the name of the author (Chamupati) despite public pressure and threats, for which Rajpal bore the subsequent legal consequences.

As a publisher Rajpal became recognized in various social circles in Lahore, as he was committed to freedom of expression and did not hide from controversial issues, even publishing a Hindi translation of Marie Stopes "Married Love" in 1925 under the title of "Vivahit Prem" and an illustrated text on family planning and contraception in 1926, both written by B. A. Santram, a scholar and social reformer member of the labor caste.

Content 
The book deals with the marriages of Muhammad and his predisposition to take wives.

Being a satire, Rangila Rasul had a surface appearance of a lyrical and laudatory work on Muhammad and his teachings, while the marital life of the prophet is treated in a praising tone, in the style of a bhakti (that is, a show of devotion to a god or saint in the Hindu tradition), and some of the controversial points of the book are in fact faithful to what the Islamic tradition indicates about the life of Muhammad. This was because the author was familiar with Islamic literature.

In one part, the author cites characteristics of the prophet, highlighting his ability to marry, which included "a widow, a virgin, an old woman, a young woman... even a budding girl", and insists on how the active sexuality of marriage is more compatible with the common man in contrast with lifelong celibacy of Hindu saints or the asceticism of other prophets. In fact, the text opens with the following lines:

The Bengali daily Amrita Bazar Patrika referred the book as follows:

Reactions

Response
The allegations of Rangila Rasul were addressed by the Muslim Qazi Maulana Sanaullah Amritsari in his book Muqaddas Rasool (The Holy Prophet).

Condemnation by Mahatma Gandhi
In June 1924, Mahatma Gandhi referred to Rangila Rasul in his weekly Young India. In his article Gandhi noted that:

Lawsuit against the publisher
Following the publication of Rangila Rasul and its subsequent controversy, the Punjab government stated its intentions to stop the distribution of the book and prevent further publication. Later the publisher, Mahashe Rajpal, received several legal demands. It eventually became clear that the Punjab government had no intention of escalating the controversy over the publication of the book, and when the Punjab Legislative Council discussed the case (at about the same time that the trial of the lawsuits against the publisher Rajpal started), concluded that:

On May 4, 1927, Justice Dali Singh of the Punjab High Court in Lahore acquitted Rajpal of the charges, but personally condemned the book as "malicious in tone" and its propensity to offend religious sensibilities of the Muslim community. The finding of innocence earned Judge Singh severe criticism and threats. In response to the finding of innocence, a mass gathering of Muslims was held in early July in front of the great Jama Masjid mosque in Delhi, which was preceded by the activist, journalist and politician Maulana Mohammad Ali. Of the event the Hindustan Times reported:

Due to social tensions, the legal case against Rangila Rasul's publisher was taken up by a Lahore magisterial court, and this time the verdict was guilty, with a sentence of 6 months in prison. However, the ruling was appealed and Judge Singh took up the case a second time, concluding that while the malicious nature of the pamphlet was a fact, it was difficult for him to proceed as there was no law against insult on religious prophets, leaving Rajpal free in 1928.

Violence

Unrest
Tensions between Muslims and Hindus in the city of Lahore in the summer of 1927 were greatly fueled by the publication of Rangila Rasul and Sair-e-Dozakh ("A walk through the Hell", an article critical of Islam published in a magazine called Risala-i-Vartman), and this eventually erupted into riots that left several dead. In fact, in Punjab the publication of Rangila Rasul facilitated social tensions for up to 6–7 years.

Publisher Murder
Rangila Rasul's editor, Mahashe Rajpal, suffered an assassination attempt in 1926. Although he survived, he was hospitalized for 3 months. Some extremist Muslim individuals, however, continued to try to take Rajpal's life and in 1927 there was another assassination attempt, but the assassin attacked a different person whom he mistook for Rajpal. Like Rajpal, the victim also survived. Ultimately, Rajpal was assassinated in Lahore on April 6, 1929, when a young Muslim carpenter named Ilm-ud-din (also known as Alimuddin or Ilam Din), who was barely 20 years old, stabbed Rajpal while he was outside his business.

Trial of the murderer
Ilm-ud-din was tried, found guilty and sentenced to death. His defence lawyer obtained an appeal before the Punjab High Court of Justice in Lahore, and to present his arguments he asked for help from Muhammad Ali Jinnah. Jinnah accepted and presented two arguments:
 Questioning the evidence presented by the court, and
 Arguing that the punishment was excessive given the age of the killer.

However, Ilm-ud-din's verdict was not overturned and the sentence was carried out on 31 October 1929.

Murderer's Exaltation
Some Muslim fundamentalist groups gave publisher Rajpal's killer the title of "Ghazi", which means "Warrior of the Faith". Recognition of the killer reached such a point that a TV movie about his actions was eventually produced in Pakistan.

Condemnation by Mahatma Gandhi
On April 18, 1929, Gandhi published an article in his weekly "Youth India" under the title "The Bomb and the Knife" in which he compared the knife from the assassination of Mahashe Rajpal with the bombs from the revolutionary act (planned not to injure anyone) against the Legislative Assembly in Delhi on April 8, 1929, by Bhagat Singh and Batukeshwar Dutt (notable members of the pro-independence Hindustan Socialist Republican Association), given the use of force and violence in both cases. Gandhi declared that both acts (the bombs thrown at the legislative assembly and the assassination of publisher Rajpal) followed the "same philosophy of mad revenge and impotent rage."

Publisher posthumous recognition
Nearly 80 years after his death, in 1997, Rajpal was posthumously recognized by the Federation of Indian Publishers with the Freedom to Publish Award, at the Delhi Book Fair.

In 2010, Rajpal received another posthumous recognition: The special prize Dare to Publish Award from the International Publishers Association.

Censorship
The book remains banned in India, Pakistan and Bangladesh given their penal codes. Physical copies of the book are hard to find.

In India
Given the controversy over the ruling that acquitted the editor (Rajpal) of Rangila Rasul, the government tried to show a stronger hand with a similar case that followed shortly after, with another publication critical of Islam in a magazine called Risala-i-Vartman. However, the new trial was not enough, and it was decided that the Imperial Legislative Council (colonial predecessor of the current Parliament of India) would analyse a possible reform of the criminal law.

The result was the Penal Code Amendment Act XXV of India in 1927, which led to the current section 295A of the Indian Penal Code that is in use today, which states:

In Pakistan
Since Pakistan and India were part of the same political unit during the colonial period, the penal reform passed by the Imperial Legislative Council was also inherited in section 295A of the Pakistan Penal Code.

During the government of General Muhammad Zia-ul-Haq (1978 - 1988), Pakistan further extended the criminalization of blasphemy by introducing sections 295B and 295C in its penal code, as well as new sections to other similar laws, namely:

 298 A: Introduced in 1980, criminalises direct or indirect desecration of wives and relatives of Muhammad.
 298 B: Introduced in 1984, it criminalises terms used by the Ahmadiyya Muslim minority with imprisonment.
 298 C: Introduced in 1984, it criminalises Muslim members of the Ahmadiyya minority for calling themselves "Muslims" and preaching or propagating their version of Islam.
 295 B: Introduced in 1982, it criminalises the desecration of the Quran. It was introduced as a reaction to a period of social panic over reports of alleged desecration of the Quran in the media.
 295 C: Introduced in 1986, it criminalises with life imprisonment or the death penalty any direct or indirect desecration of Muhammad.

While some of the norms are open discrimination (against the minority Ahmadi Muslims), others discriminate indirectly, since although 295A in theory covers all religions from possible profanation, the new sections 295B and 295C (introduced in 1982 and 1986 respectively), as well as 298A; give preferential protection to Islam.

See also 
 Criticism of Muhammad
 Blasphemy in India
 Blasphemy in Pakistan
 List of books banned in India
 Religious violence in India

Bibliography

References

External links 
Rangila Rasul (Hindi) at the Internet Archive
 Rangila Rasul (Urdu) at the Internet Archive
 Muqaddas Rasool Ba-Jawab Rangila Rasool [Hindi] at the Internet Archive 
 Muqaddas Rasool Ba-Jawab Rangila Rasool [Urdu] at the Internet Archive

Urdu-language books
Islam-related controversies
Books critical of Islam
1924 non-fiction books
Censored books
Censorship in India
Cultural depictions of Muhammad
Biographies of Muhammad
20th-century Indian books